Oasis is a census-designated place (CDP) located in eastern Elko County, Nevada, United States, at the junction of State Route 233 and Interstate 80,  northwest of the Utah border and  east of Elko. As of the 2008 American Community Survey it had a population of 34.

Demographics

Description

Oasis is named for the Oasis Ranch, which in the late 1880s was owned by E. C. Hardy.

The community is part of the Elko Micropolitan Statistical Area.

See also
 List of census-designated places in Nevada

References

External links

Census-designated places in Nevada
Census-designated places in Elko County, Nevada
Elko, Nevada micropolitan area